Bhagavad Gita - The Song of God is the title of the Swami Prabhavananda Christopher Isherwood's translation of the Bhagavad Gītā (Sanskrit: , "Song of God"), an important Hindu scripture. It was first published in 1944 with an Introduction by Aldous Huxley.  This translation is unusual in that it is a collaboration between a world-renowned English language author and an adept in Vedanta Philosophy and Hindu scripture. With this translation, "...the very purpose of life in Hindu terms becomes luminously clear.”.  The 2023 edition includes the standardized verse markings that were left out from the original, published in 1944.

Aldous Huxley wrote the introduction and gave advice during the translation process, “Forget that Krishna is speaking to the Hindus in Sanskrit. Forget that this is a translation. Think that Krishna is speaking to an American audience in English.”  "Christopher Isherwood could not read Sanskrit; he relied on detailed and intense discussions with Swami Prabhavananda to understand the meaning of each word. Then he cast the ancient Hindu text in a mixture of poetry and prose rooted in the English literary tradition reaching back to Medieval times."

Despite the translation's merits, it has been criticized for not including the standard verse numbers, making it difficult to compare to other translations and some critics take issue with the translation of particular verses. However, "To preserve the everlasting simplicity of the Gita’s words… Isherwood…and his teacher [Swami Prabhavananda] have collaborated on this latest translation… the result is a distinguished literary work… simpler and freer than other English translations… It may help U.S. readers to understand not only the Gita itself, but also its influence on American letters through one of its greatest U.S. admirers, Ralph Waldo Emerson."

The translation was well received in the U.S. and earned reviews in the New York Times, Time Magazine, and was adopted as a text book in many colleges and universities, for comparative religion studies. It sold over 1,000,000 copies since its first publication in 1944.

Origin of Translation

Swami Vivekananda, the founder of the Ramakrishna Order in India, brought Vedanta to the West beginning with his appearance at the 1893 Chicago Parliament of Religions and establishing the first Vedanta Societies in America. From his early days in the US, a priority was placed on translating the great scriptures of India into English. Vivekananda wrote:

No foreigner will ever write the English language as well as the native Englishman, and the ideas, when put in good English, will spread farther than in Hindu English.
 - Swami Vivekananda

Swami Prabhavananda, a monk of the Ramakrishna Order and founder and head of the Vedanta Society of Southern California, first came to the US in 1923, assigned to the Vedanta Society of San Francisco. In 1930, he founded the Vedanta Society of Southern California, and within the decade he had attracted many notable literary disciples, including English authors, Gerald Heard, Aldous Huxley, and Christopher Isherwood.

While the Swami was on vacation in Palm Springs, he was reading an English translation of the Gita and felt the meaning was lost. After consulting with his literary disciples, he decided to take on the effort to produce a new translation.

Preface to [the 2023] Edition

In the preface to the new edition, a more detailed description of the origin of the translation is given. It also explains why this translation does not have the traditional commentary, that is usually given after each verse. Two foundational Swamis of the Ramakrishna Order had this advice: Swami Brahmananda, Prabhavananda's guru, said, “Let your first reading of the Gita be without commentary.” And Swami Saradananda says in his book The Essence of the Gita, “It is not necessary for you to study all those commentaries… It is enough to understand the meaning as it reveals itself to you spontaneously.”

Prabhavananda and Isherwood felt it was more important to incorporate the commentaries into the text itself, rather than have the story of the Gita interrupted by explanations. They also decided not to include the verse numbers. The point is made that the "...sole purpose of this [2023] edition is to include those standardized chapter and verse markings to facilitate comparisons to other translations. Otherwise, this edition is faithful to the Prabhavananda-Isherwood Gita."

Translators’ Preface

Prabhavananda and Isherwood explain how the Gita is actually just a small part of the epic poem, the Mahabharata (chapters 23–40 of book 6). It's also explained why the original is in all verse, but they decided to be more flexible with the writing, "...we have translated the Gita in a variety of styles, partly prose, partly verse. There is, of course, no justification for this experiment in the text itself. The transitions from one style to another are quite arbitrary. They can be judged from one standpoint only: have we made the book more readable?"

The translators also explains why they were more free with their translation, compared to others, "Extremely literal translations of the Gita already exist. We have aimed, rather, at an interpretation. Here is one of the greatest religious documents of the world: let us not approach it too pedantically as an archaic text which must be jealously preserved by university professors. It has something to say, urgently, to every one of us."

Introduction by Aldous Huxley

In Huxley's introduction, he takes a sweeping view of the Perennial Philosophy and touches on the history of the concept that there is an underlying reality that all the traditional religions acknowledge - the Godhead, Clear LIght of the Void, Brahman, etc. He also gives us a version of his Minimum Working Hypothisis, instructions for how to seek the experience of the highest reality.

Gita and Mahabharata

The translators give an in-depth description of the events leading up to the plot of the Gita. As the name suggest it is the story of the great (Maha) King Bharata. All of India is drawn into a war, which is used as a metaphor for the battle that we face inside ourselves; the battle of good vs. evil, right conduct vs. failing to act. The principle actors in the poem are Sri Krishna, an incarnation of God, and Arjuna, a "high-souled prince" who falters on the battlefield after seeing friends and family in the enemy's ranks, who Arjuna is called to kill. Arjuna drops his weapons and declares he will not fight.

The rest of the book has Krishna, Arjuna's friend and advisor, explaining duty, the meaning of life, and describes a life of right conduct, through the various Yogas (paths). In the end, Arjuna realizes it is his duty and purpose to fight in the righteous war, and wins.

Chapters
There are a total of 18 chapters and 700 verses in Gita. These are:

The Cosmology of the Gita

After the 18 Chapters of the Gita itself, there is an Appendix where the translators explain how the Gita fits into the overall philosophy of Hindu religious literature. They also give a summary of Vedic cosmology and descriptions of the various deities in Hindu culture.

The Gita and War

Christopher Isherwood was a pacifist and Conscientiousness Objector in WWII, having suffered his father death in WWI and seeing no effort by the allies to avoid plunging head-long into the next war. In England he was a member of the Peace Pledge Union, and during the war while in the US, he did alternative service with the Quakers.

In this Appendix, Isherwood explains that the Gita is neither pro- nor anti- war. In certain circumstances, it would be quite alright to refuse to fight. In Arjuna's position, since it's a righteous war, and he's a warrior by birth and trade - he must fight.
In the purely physical sphere of action, Arjuna is, indeed, no longer a free agent. The act of war is upon him; it has evolved out of his previous actions. At any given moment in time, we are what we are; and we have to accept the consequences of being ourselves. Only through this acceptance can we begin to evolve further. We may select the battleground. We cannot avoid the battle.

Editions

First published by The Marcel Rodd Co. Hollywood, CA, 1944
Hardback edition by Vedanta Press, 1945
Mentor Religious Classics, Harper & Row, NY, 1951
Published in England by Phoenix House Ltd.
Vedanta Press, Hollywood, CA, 1944–2023

Reviews of this Translation

"The eternal message of the Gita has been rendered into simple language which is devoid of technicalities of dogma and doctrine and rises into suitable poetry where the sublimity of thought requires it. Swami Prabhavananda’s name is a guarantee of the authoritative nature of the translation and its being faithful to the true spirit of the original." - Prabuddha Bharata, March, 1946

"DEMOCRACY would have been impossible without the dissemination of knowledge...For that reason alone this paper-back edition [1954] of one of the most profound books ever written, often compared to the Sermon on the Mount, is a publishing event of major importance. Here the common man...may make the acquaintance of perhaps the greatest clarity that mysticism has ever achieved...The ideas in this philosophical dialogue...are subtle, surprising, precise. The “Gita," however, is also a song. It develops its ideas rhapsodically, ecstatically...The “Gita” is one of the most beautiful books. It explains and it delights...It is presented in one of the outstanding translations of the day." - Gerald Sykes, The New York Times, March 28, 1954

"To preserve the everlasting simplicity of the Gita’s words…Isherwood…and his teacher [Swami Prabhavananda] have collaborated on this latest translation…the result is a distinguished literary work…simpler and freer than other English translations…It may help U.S. readers to understand not only the Gita itself, but also its influence on American letters through one of its greatest U.S. admirers, Ralph Waldo Emerson." - Time Magazine, February 12, 1945

"For many Westerners, their introduction to Hinduism came not from yoga or a respected guru, but from a boyish British author, Christopher Isherwood, a Renaissance man of letters, writing plays, short stories, screenplays, poems, novels and nonfiction. Though he is perhaps best known as the author of such works as The Berlin Stories (later made into the hit play and movie, “Cabaret”), his involvement in the Vedanta movement in California from the 1940s through the 1980s left a permanent imprint on the cultural landscape...The English version of the Song of God: Bhagavad Gita was Isherwood's crowning achievement." - Mark Hawthorne, Vedanta’s Western Poet, Hinduism Today, September 1, 1999

[From a critique concerning translations] "A translation of literary worth...seemed preferable to a simon-pure translation...As a master translator, Edward Fitzgerald, put it: “Better a live sparrow than a stuffed eagle.” ...In violation of this principle, Mr. Y. has decided to use the Edwin Arnold translation of the Bhagavad Gita rather than—say—the Christopher Isherwood-Swami Prabhavananda version. In my opinion...there is no comparison between the ponderous cadences of the first, and the clean lucidity of the second." - The New York Times, November 11, 1956

"The translation, in poetry and prose, is the celebrated one by Christopher Isherwood and Swami Prabhavananda…the very purpose of life in Hindu terms becomes luminously clear." - Paul Kresh, The New York Times, May 10, 1981

Reviews of the 2023 Edition

"Translations come in many hues and fulfill different needs. Bhagavad Gita: The Song of God, the translation by Swami Prabhavananda and Christopher Isherwood, cuts to the chase by focusing on the essential teaching in every verse—and does this in both poetry and prose that is as elegant as it is insightful. The book effortlessly captures the beauty and the rhythm of the Gita." - Swami Tyagananda, Hindu Chaplain, Harvard and MIT, 2022

"The ageless wisdom of the Gita will never be brought into classic English prose with greater clarity, humanity and selflessness than in this priceless rendition. What a joy to have it brought to us afresh in this new edition, Isherwood’s rare elegance married to his beloved teacher’s wise command of the scriptures." Pico Iyer, Author of Video Night in Kathmandu, The Lady and the Monk, and The Global Soul. Contributor to Time, Harper's, New York Review of Books, and The New York Times. He also taught at Harvard and Princeton, 2022

"As World War II raged and the dissolution of the British Empire drew near, an Indian and an Englishman, both disillusioned radicals, collaborated in Hollywood on this singular translation. In Vedanta, they had found the peace and freedom that politics had failed to deliver. Christopher Isherwood could not read Sanskrit; he relied on detailed and intense discussions with Swami Prabhavananda to understand the meaning of each word. Then he cast the ancient Hindu text in a mixture of poetry and prose rooted in the English literary tradition reaching back to Medieval times. For clarity, economy and sheer excitement, their English rendering of the Bhagavad Gita has never been equaled." - Katherine Bucknell, editor of Christopher Isherwood's DIARIES and
Director of The Christopher Isherwood Foundation, 2023

"Back in the late 1960s when many young Americans were interested in self-actualization via Asian religions, I (and thousands of others, I'm sure) were first drawn to study Vedanta after reading the Bhagavad-Gita as translated by Swami Prabhavananda and Christopher Isherwood. The former deeply understood the message of the text and the latter knew how to convey that message in masterful English. The mixture was captivating, leading many to start on a life-long quest to dig deeper into the substance of Vedanta. This is a literary rather than a literal translation, for reasons mainly related to the flow of the text and making the message clear in English, to an English speaking audience; I find the true teachings to be fully intact, so the appeal is there for a new audience in modern times. Moreover, this new edition includes the verse references that were missing from the original 1944 edition, a welcome and necessary addition, for comparison to other translations and scholarly study." - Dana Sawyer, Professor of Philosophy Emeritus, Maine Arts College, Author of Huston Smith: Wisdomkeeper, the authorized biography, and author of Aldous Huxley: A Biography, 2023

"The Bhagavad Gita–or simply the Gita, for those who know and love it well–is of course a classic of Indian literature, and of world spiritual literature, as well as being a sacred text for Hindus. This particular translation of the Gita, by Swami Prabhavananda and Christopher Isherwood, is itself a classic in the genre of Gita translations. It has been, for many, a gateway to Hindu thought and to the profound philosophy of Vedanta. Beautifully and clearly written, it was designed specifically with an American audience in mind. But it has proven to be an accessible introduction to this text for readers around the world, even within India itself. This latest edition does not alter the work of Swami Prabhavananda and Christopher Isherwood at all; but by providing the original verse numbers of the source text, it makes this translation of even greater value for students and scholars than it already was. It is a most welcome addition to any library, personal or public, and it will no doubt continue to open minds to the message of the Gita well into the twenty-first century and beyond." - Jeffery D. Long, Author Hinduism in America, Professor of Religion, Philosophy, and Asian Studies, Elizabethtown College

References

2023 books
Bhagavad Gita
Vedanta